Raskelf railway station served the village of Raskelf, North Yorkshire, England from 1841 to 1964 on the East Coast Main Line.

History 
The station opened on 1 August 1841 by the Great North of England Railway. It was due to be rebuilt in 1933, but it was closed to passengers on 5 May 1958 and closed completely in 1964.

References

External links 

Disused railway stations in North Yorkshire
Former North Eastern Railway (UK) stations
Railway stations in Great Britain opened in 1841
Railway stations in Great Britain closed in 1958
1841 establishments in England
1964 disestablishments in England